The Lachnocladiaceae are a family of fungi in the order Russulales. A 2008 estimate places 124 species in 8 genera in the Lachnocladiaceae. Species of this family, which have a widespread distribution in both tropical and temperate zones, are typically found on decaying coniferous or deciduous wood. The family was circumscribed by British mycologist Derek Reid in 1965.

References

Russulales
Lachnocladiaceae
Taxa named by Derek Reid
Taxa described in 1965